The Bell Range, formerly spelled Belle Range, is a small subrange of the Kitimat Ranges, located east of Welcome Harbour on Porcher Island, British Columbia, Canada.

References

Bell Range in the Canadian Mountain Encyclopedia

Kitimat Ranges